The Last Chancers was originally a one-off television sitcom, screened under the Comedy Lab banner at 11:40pm on Thursday 21 November 2002. This show was later developed into a five-part series which was broadcast on E4 in December 2002. Currently the Channel 4 website has one series consisting of eight episodes listed.

Cast
Adam Buxton - Johnny
Steve John Shepherd - Paul
Kevin Bishop - Dan
Patrick Driver - Brian
Tony MacMurray - Alex
Alice Lowe - Claire
Joe van Moyland - Tom

Crew
Tony MacMurray - Writer
Stephen Merchant - Director
James Harding - Executive Producer
Richard Osborne - Executive Producer
Sally Martin - Producer

External links
BBC Comedy Guide article
Channel4.com article

Channel4.com episode guide

2002 British television series debuts
2004 British television series debuts
British comedy television shows
2000s British sitcoms